Excellent Cadaver is an American film and television production company founded by actress Jennifer Lawrence in 2018.

History
In 2018, Excellent Cadaver was founded by actress Jennifer Lawrence. Lawrence will produce with her producing partner, Justine Polsky.

In October 2018, it was announced that the company had signed a first-look deal with Makeready, who will finance and produce independently with Excellent Cadaver, or through Makeready's finance and production deals with Universal Pictures and Entertainment One.

According to a Facebook post in November 2022, animator and filmmaker Don Herzfeldt was approached by Lawrence to create an animated logo for the company. The logo was featured in the company's first feature film, Causeway. In January 2023, Causeway went on to receive the company's first Academy Award nomination for Brian Tyree Henry in the Best Supporting Actor category.

Filmography

Released
 Causeway (with IAC Films and A24)

Upcoming
 No Hard Feelings (with Sony Pictures)

In production
 Bad Blood (with Hyperobject Industries, Gary Sanchez Productions, Legendary Pictures, and Apple Studios)
 Sue (with Picturestart and Apple Studios)
 Die, My Love

References

External links
 Excellent Cadaver on IMDb

Mass media companies established in 2018
Film production companies of the United States